Gold Hill is an unincorporated community and a census-designated place (CDP) located in and governed by Boulder County, Colorado, United States. The CDP is a part of the Boulder, CO Metropolitan Statistical Area. The population of the Gold Hill CDP was 230 at the United States Census 2010. The Boulder post office (Zip Code 80302) serves the area.

Gold Hill is located to the northwest of Boulder, perched on a mountainside above Left Hand Canyon at an elevation of 8,300 feet. Originally a mining camp, it was the site of the first major discovery of gold during the 1859 Colorado Gold Rush and remained an important mining camp throughout the late 19th century, with a population approaching 1500 at its height, before falling into decline. It has been revived somewhat in recent years as a quiet isolated haven, with no paved streets, but easily accessed by dirt roads. The town contains numerous historic wooden structures, some restored in recent years, as well as decaying ruins from its mining heyday. It has a small museum and two-room schoolhouse, the Gold Hill School, which since 1873 has been the oldest continuously operating public school in Colorado. Other businesses include a General Store and a restored inn listed on the National Register of Historic Places. The town is laid out on a small grid of dirt streets.

Gold Hill is accessible from nearby Left Hand Canyon Road via Lick Skillet Road. Easier approaches to Gold Hill include Sunshine Canyon Road from 4th and Mapleton in Boulder, Gold Run Road from Salina (on Four Mile Canyon Road), and Gold Hill Road from the Peak to Peak Highway (State Highway 72) south of Ward. All of these roads are susceptible to heavy snows during the winter, which at times render Gold Hill inaccessible to vehicles not equipped with chains or four wheel drive.

Gold Hill is sometimes labeled a ghost town, which is an inaccurate designation.  Gold Hill is part of unincorporated Boulder County, and while it does not have a municipal government, it does have an active town meeting with elected officials.

History

The community is located above Gold Run, the first lode discovery of gold in Colorado (at that time the area was part of the Nebraska Territory) on January 15, 1859. The discovery occurred nearly simultaneous with prospecting in Gregory Gulch and Clear Creek, but these latter discoveries were not exploited until later that Spring. On March 7, 1859, the Gold Run discovery became the first mining district in region (named either the Mountain District No. 1, Mining District No. 1 of the Nebraska Territory, or the Nebraska Gold Hill Mining District, according to various historical sources). Word quickly spread among miners in the region, prompting a flood of new arrivals and the establishment of Gold Hill as the first permanent mining camp in present-day Colorado. By autumn, a quartz stamp mill was erected at the base of the hill, the first such piece of equipment in the region, one that had been transported by ox cart westward over the Great Plains. The first productive vein was the Scott, followed quickly the Horsfal, Alamakee, and Cold Spring. Nearby placers were also worked for the gold in stream beds.

By 1861, the year of the organization of the Colorado Territory, the surface deposits of gold in the vicinity of the town were largely played out, resulting in a temporary exodus of prospectors and a population decrease. The town was somewhat revived later that year by the construction of the Hill smelter at nearby Black Hawk, allowing the treatment of lower-grade ores.

The discovery of tellurium in the area in 1872 prompted a second boom, bringing the population to nearly 1000 once again. At its height, the town had a newspaper and number of hotels, including the Mines Hotel, built in 1872 and recently restored as summer tourist destination. The Mines was immortalized in verse by poet Eugene Field, who stayed at the hotel while working as a newspaper man in Denver. The town population dwindled in the early 20th century as the mining tapered off. The town has experienced two major fires in its history, but it nevertheless retains many of its historic wooden structures.

Despite a dwindling permanent population, Gold Hill continued to remain attractive to tourists. Around 1926 Florence Molloy and Mabel MacLeay, previously the owners of the Molloy-MacLeay taxicab company in Boulder, CO, opened the Double M Dude Ranch (or M&M ranch, then Trojan Ranch, and now the Colorado Mountain Ranch) in Gold Hill, CO. The Syracuse Herald, described the Double M as offering, “all the attractions of the open spaces of the West sufficiently tempered with luxuries to meet the requirement of Easterners.” The Double MM operated until World War II when it was sold in 1941 and subsequently became the Trojan Ranch and then later the Colorado Mountain Ranch (currently in operation).

In 1921, The Holiday House Association of Chicago, started by Jean Sherwood, purchased the hotel at Gold Hill, now the Gold Hill Inn, to create a summer camp destination for self-supporting single women from Chicago. These vacationing women were referred to as "Bluebirds." The Bluebird Lodge addition to the hotel was completed around 1926.

In September 2010, the Four Mile Canyon wildfire destroyed approximately 170 homes in and around Gold Hill.

Geography

Demographics

See also

Outline of Colorado
Index of Colorado-related articles
State of Colorado
Colorado cities and towns
Colorado census designated places
Colorado counties
Boulder County, Colorado
List of statistical areas in Colorado
Front Range Urban Corridor
North Central Colorado Urban Area
Denver-Aurora-Boulder, CO Combined Statistical Area
Boulder, CO Metropolitan Statistical Area

References

Further reading
Brown, Robert L.  Jeep Trails to Colorado Ghost Towns.  Caldwell: Caxton, 1963.

External links

Gold Hill, Colorado
Gold Hill @ WesternMiningHistory.com
Gold Hill @ ColoradoEncyclopedia.org
Original Gold Hill Townsite @ ColoradoPreservation.org
Gold Hill @ GhostTowns.com
Gold Hill Mining District @ Mindat.org
Gold Hill, Colorado Mining Claims And Mines
Walking Tour of Gold Hill
Boulder County website

Census-designated places in Boulder County, Colorado
Census-designated places in Colorado
1859 establishments in Nebraska Territory
Colorado Mining Boom
Historic districts on the National Register of Historic Places in Colorado
National Register of Historic Places in Boulder County, Colorado